COP9 constitutive photomorphogenic homolog subunit 5 (Arabidopsis), also known as COPS5 or Csn5, is a gene conserved from humans to Saccharomyces cerevisiae.

Function 

The protein encoded by this gene is one of the eight subunits of COP9 signalosome, a highly conserved protein complex that functions as an important regulator in multiple signaling pathways. The structure and function of COP9 signalosome is similar to that of the 19S regulatory particle of 26S proteasome. COP9 signalosome has been shown to interact with SCF-type E3 ubiquitin ligases and act as a positive regulator of E3 ubiquitin ligases. This protein is reported to be involved in the degradation of  cyclin-dependent kinase inhibitor CDKN1B/p27Kip1. It is also known to be a coactivator that increases the specificity of JUN/AP1 transcription factors.

Interactions 

COP9 constitutive photomorphogenic homolog subunit 5 has been shown to interact with Macrophage migration inhibitory factor, GFER, BCL3, Ubiquitin carboxy-terminal hydrolase L1, S100A7 and C-jun.

See also 
COPS1
COPS2
COPS3
COPS4
COPS6
COPS7A
COPS7B
COPS8

References

External links

Further reading